El Arco is a village and municipality in the province of Salamanca,  western Spain, part of the autonomous community of Castile-Leon. It is located 24 kilometers from the provincial capital city of Salamanca and has a population of 93 people.

Geography

The postal code is 37797.

See also 
 List of municipalities in Salamanca

References

Municipalities in the Province of Salamanca